Tatobotys biannulalis is a moth in the family Crambidae. It was described by Francis Walker in 1866. It is found on Borneo and in Indonesia (the Sula Islands), the New Hebrides, Fiji, Samoa, Japan, Sri Lanka and Australia, where it has been recorded from the Northern Territory and Queensland.

References

Moths described in 1866
Spilomelinae